Dezideriu Jenei (born 25 June 1960) is a Romanian speed skater. He competed at the 1980 Winter Olympics and the 1984 Winter Olympics.

References

1960 births
Living people
Romanian male speed skaters
Olympic speed skaters of Romania
Speed skaters at the 1980 Winter Olympics
Speed skaters at the 1984 Winter Olympics
Sportspeople from Cluj-Napoca